Little Dreamer may refer to:

Little Dreamer (Peter Green album), 1980
Little Dreamer (Beth Rowley album)
Little Dreamer (Negazione album)
"Little Dreamer" (song), a 1989 song by Status Quo
"Little Dreamer", from Christina Aguilera's album Bionic
"Little Dreamer", from Van Halen's album Van Halen